Heroes of the Frontier is a 2016 novel by Dave Eggers. It concerns a dentist who moves with her children to Alaska after a failed relationship with the children's father.

References

2016 American novels
Novels set in Alaska
Alfred A. Knopf books
Hamish Hamilton books